Wiseman Mncube (born 1990), is a South African actor, playwright, singer and director. He is best known for the roles in the television serials such as; Gold Diggers, EHostela and Uzalo.

Personal life
Mncube was born in 1990 in Ulundi, Durban, South Africa in a family with five siblings. He completed his National Diploma in Drama from the Durban University of Technology (DUT) in 2011. His elder brother Ntando Mncube, who played the role "Bhekile" on the serial Ifalakhe. His younger brother Omega is also an actor, who played the popular role "Phelelani" on Uzalo.

His wife died in 2017, where he is currently lives with his daughter, Lwandle. In February 2021, he welcomed another child, a son.

Career
He started his acting career as a theatre actor during his life at DUT. Some of his notable theatre plays include; Nothing But the Truth, Horn of Sorrow, Meet Bro Six Two, Culture Clash, Amambazo The Musical, Have We Been Heard and Mashu the Musical. In November 2012, he wrote and directed the play The Weeping Candle. The play became critically acclaimed and Mncube won the awards for Best Production and Best Script at the isiGcawu Festival. In the same year, he won The Best Newcomer Award at the Mercury Theatre Awards as well as Best Actor at Musho Festival. Then he performed in the play Giving Birth to my Father and won the Standard Bank Ovation Award. In 2014, he wins three National Arts Festival (NAF) awards in Grahamstown. In 2015, he was selected as one of the directors of the Musho Festival.

In 2016, he made television debut with the drama serial The Kingdom-UKhakhayi and played the role of "Mfanufikile". After gaining popularity, he joined with the e.tv telenovela Gold Diggers. In 2018, he acted in the TV Mini Series Liberty by playing the role "Reggie". In 2019, he appeared in the television serial EHostela and played the role "Jama". In 2020, he won the Best Actor Award in TV Drama category at the South African Film and Television Awards (SAFTA) for this role. In the same year, he won another award at the Mzansi Viewers Choice Awards.

Then he made the supportive role "Sibonelo" on the soap opera Uzalo. In mid 2019, he acted in the feature film The Turning Son with the role "Vusi Ndlovu" and then acted in the 2020 film Rage of a Lioness with the role "Siya".

Apart from acting, he is also a singer. He released the gqom song Pick & Choose along with Vukani Khoza.

Filmography

References

External links
 IMDb

Living people
South African male film actors
South African male television actors
South African male stage actors
1990 births